Geoffrey Robertson Crawford, DCM (16 December 1916 – 29 December 1998) was an Australian politician. He was a member of the New South Wales Legislative Assembly for the Country Party from 1950 to 1976, and served as Minister for Agriculture from 1968 until 1975.

Crawford was born in Inverell, New South Wales and educated at a state high school. He initially worked as a farm hand and share farmer before buying his own farm in the Inverell district. He served in the  Second Australian Imperial Force  in North Africa and New Guinea and received the Distinguished Conduct Medal in 1944.  Crawford was elected to the New South Wales Parliament as the Country Party member for Barwon at the 1950 state election. He defeated the sitting member  Roy Heferen who had been disendorsed by the Labor Party after breaking caucus solidarity during an indirect election of the New South Wales Legislative Council. Crawford held the seat for the next 8 elections. He retired at the 1976 state election. During the premierships of Robert Askin and Tom Lewis he was Minister for Agriculture. He also held various parliamentary positions including Chairman of Committees and Deputy Speaker.

References

 

1916 births
1998 deaths
National Party of Australia members of the Parliament of New South Wales
Members of the New South Wales Legislative Assembly
20th-century Australian politicians
Australian recipients of the Distinguished Conduct Medal
Australian Army personnel of World War II
Australian Army soldiers